The following is a list of episodes for the Australian television drama mystery programme, The Doctor Blake Mysteries.

Series overview

Episodes

Series 1 (2013)

Series 2 (2014)

Series 3 (2015)

Series 4 (2016)

Series 5 (2017)

Telemovie (2017)

In the UK, the first telemovie (episode number 45) was broadcast in two parts as episodes 9 and 10 of series 5 on 24 and 25 May 2018.

Ratings

References

External links
 
 Australian television information archive The Doctor Blake Mysteries: episode guide

Fiction set in 1959
Fiction set in 1960
Doctor Blake Mysteries episodes, List of The